Beyg Oveysi (also Romanized as Beyg Oveysī; also known as Beyg Ovbast and Beyk Oveysī) is a village in Torjan Rural District, in the Central District of Saqqez County, Kurdistan Province, Iran. At the 2006 census, its population was 336, in 71 families. The village is populated by Kurds.

References 

Towns and villages in Saqqez County
Kurdish settlements in Kurdistan Province